Jimmy Gooch (1928-2011) was an international speedway rider from England.

Speedway career 
Gooch reached the final of the Speedway World Championship in the 1965 Individual Speedway World Championship.

In 1966, he was runner up in the Australian Championship.

He rode in the top tier of British Speedway from 1950 to 1970, riding for various clubs. He was capped by England ten times and Great Britain three times.

World final appearances

Individual World Championship
 1965 –  London, Wembley Stadium – 14th – 3pts

World Team Cup
 1965 -  Kempten (with Barry Briggs / Charlie Monk / Ken McKinlay / Nigel Boocock) - 3rd - 18pts (3)

References 

1928 births
2011 deaths
British speedway riders
Bradford Dukes riders
Hackney Hawks riders
Ipswich Witches riders
New Cross Rangers riders
Newport Wasps riders
Norwich Stars riders
Oxford Cheetahs riders
Swindon Robins riders
Wembley Lions riders